Stephanie Edwards (born May 13, 1968), better known by her stage name Sparkle, is an American R&B singer. She began her career in 1998 as a protégé of fellow Chicago native R. Kelly. Sparkle is best known for her 1998 R&B debut hit single "Be Careful".

Career
Sparkle first started singing in her family's gospel music group. Sparkle met singer R. Kelly in 1989. Sparkle was the first and only successful artist to release an album on Kelly's Rockland label. Sparkle's début album, the self-titled Sparkle, was released on May 19, 1998. The album debuted at No. 3 on the Billboard 200 and No. 2 on the R&B charts and was certified gold soon after its release. The album is best known for the single "Be Careful," a 1998 duet with R. Kelly, which made it to two of Billboard's major airplay charts, peaking at No. 3 on the Rhythmic Top 40 and charted at No. 1 on Billboard's Hot R&B Airplay for six consecutive weeks, while also reaching No. 7 in the UK.
Despite the success of her début album, Sparkle and R. Kelly began to have creative differences while working on her second album, which led to her asking to be released from Rockland/Interscope. She then signed with Motown Records, where she would release her second album Told You So in 2000. However, the album didn't do as well because of lack of promotion, only making it to 121 on the Billboard 200, while scoring a minor hit with the single "It's a Fact". On August 13, 2012, Sparkle released her first music video in 12 years called "So Bad"; however, the single is currently not available for purchase on iTunes or any digital music outlet.

Works
Sparkle has worked with several artists, including Aaliyah (backing vocals on Age Ain't Nothing but a Number album), R. Kelly on R; Mary J. Blige on  Share My World; Wyclef Jean on "Loving You Remix"; Avant on the remix of "Separated" which features Kelly Rowland; Joe on "Woman's Heart", Jimmy Sommers; and Tank. Sparkle also has sung background vocals for Toni Braxton in her Las Vegas stage show Toni Braxton Revealed.

Personal life
In 2002, the Chicago Police and a writer for the Chicago Sun Times showed Sparkle a videotape allegedly of her young niece, then approximately 14, and R. Kelly engaging in sexual acts. Sparkle identified the young girl as her niece. Sparkle testified against R. Kelly in a subsequent criminal trial on charges of child pornography in 2008. However, in the end, the jury found Kelly not guilty in the case.

Discography

Albums

Singles
 "Be Careful" (featuring R. Kelly) (1998)
 "Time to Move On" (1998)
 "What About" (1998) 
 "Lovin You" (1999) 
 "It's a Fact" (2000)
 "Good Life" (2001)
 "So Bad" (2012)
 "We Are Ready" (2018)
 "Easy" (2020)
 "Open Letter" (2021)

References

External links
 2019 New York Times article on Sparkle

American contemporary R&B singers
1975 births
Living people
Singers from Chicago
African-American women singer-songwriters
Interscope Records artists
Motown artists
Place of birth missing (living people)
21st-century African-American women singers
20th-century African-American women singers
Singer-songwriters from Illinois